Mahmudabad (also Romanized as Maḩmūdābād) is a village in Fuladlui Jonubi Rural District, Hir District, Ardabil County, Ardabil Province, Iran. At the 2006 census, its population was 204, in 46 families.

References 

Towns and villages in Ardabil County